DIE SNOBS – Sie können auch ohne Dich is a German television series starring Christian Ulmen, Wilfried Hochholdinger.

See also
List of German television series

External links
 

German comedy television series
2010 German television series debuts
2011 German television series endings
German-language television shows
ZDF original programming